King Al Akbar  is a New Zealand-bred Hong Kong based racehorse. He won five races in the season of 2010-2011. He was one of the nominees of 2010-2011 Hong Kong Horse of the Year.

References

 The Hong Kong Jockey Club

Racehorses bred in New Zealand
Racehorses trained in Hong Kong
Hong Kong racehorses
Thoroughbred family 24